The 1956–57 exodus and expulsions from Egypt was the exodus and expulsion of Egypt's Mutamassirun, which began during the latter stages of the Suez Crisis in Nasserist Egypt.

Background

The exodus of the Mutamassirun ("Egyptianized"), which included the British and French colonial powers, as well as the Jews, Greeks, Italians, Syro-Lebanese and the Armenians, began after World War I. By the end of the 1960s, the exodus of the "foreign population" was effectively complete. According to Andrew Gorman, this was primarily a result of the "decolonization process and the rise of Egyptian nationalism". Following the invasion of Egypt by Britain, France and Israel in 1956, the new president Gamal Abdel Nasser enacted a set of sweeping regulations abolishing civil liberties whilst implenting targeted policies, allowing the state to stage mass arrests and strip away Egyptian citizenship from any group it desired. Some lawyers, engineers, doctors and teachers were no longer allowed to work in their professions. As part of its new policy, 1,000 Jews were arrested and 500 Jewish businesses were seized by the government. Jewish bank accounts were confiscated and many people lost their jobs.

Expulsion

The actions taken to encourage emigration or expel the foreign minorities applied to the whole Mutamassirun population, and after 1956 a large majority of Greeks, Syro-Lebanese, Italians, Belgians, French, and British, including Jews, left the country. The expellees were allowed to take only one suitcase and a small sum of cash, and forced to sign declarations "donating" their property to the Egyptian government. 

On 9 December 1956, Egyptian Interior Minister Zakaria Mohieddin stated that of Egypt's 18,000 British and French citizens, 1,452 had been ordered to be expelled.

Jews 
The decree was also relevant to Egyptian Jews suspected as Zionist agents, especially those with free professions and relatives in Israel. Although there was an indigenous Jewish population, most Jews in Egypt in the early twentieth century were recent immigrants to the country, who did not share the Arabic language and culture. Until the late 1930s, the foreign minorities, including both indigenous and recent immigrant Jews, tended to apply for dual-citizenship in addition to their Egyptian birth citizenship order to benefit from a foreign protection. 

Some 23,000—25,000 Jews out of 60,000 in Egypt left, mainly for Israel, Europe, the United States and South America. Many were forced to sign declarations that they were voluntarily emigrating and agreed to the confiscation of their assets. Similar measures were enacted against British and French nationals in retaliation for the invasion. By 1957 the Jewish population of Egypt had fallen to 15,000.

The Guardian correspondent Michael Adams noted in 1958 that the Egyptian government ultimately expelled a minority of the Jewish population of Egypt, though many Jews left as a result of increasing pressure. This is supported by Professor Michael Laskier who claims: "It is estimated that as early as the end of November 1956 at least 500 Egyptian and stateless Jews had been expelled from Egypt". In contrast, Max Elstein Keisler claims that "around 25 000 Jews were expelled that year (1956)", equivalent to all of the Jews who left Egypt in 1956.

In fiction 
 Kamal Ruhayyim's novel Days in the Diaspora portrays the life of an exiled family whose mother is an Egyptian Jew.
 André Aciman's memoir Out of Egypt addresses the experience of his family in Alexandria.
 Naguib Mahfouz's novel Miramar takes place in a pension belonging to Mariana, a Greek woman who laments the expulsions' effects on her life and business.

See also 
Armenians in Egypt
Syro-Lebanese in Egypt
Greeks in Egypt
Italian Egyptians
History of the Jews in Egypt
Operation Goshen

References

Sources and further reading
 
 
 
 

1956 in Egypt
Anti-immigration politics in Africa
Antisemitism in Egypt
Economic antisemitism
Egyptian nationalism
Jews and Judaism in Egypt
Jewish Egyptian history
Expulsions of Jews
Greeks in Egypt
Nasserism
Racism in Egypt
Xenophobia in Africa
1957 in Egypt
1956 in religion
1957 in religion
Jewish exodus from Arab and Muslim countries
20th-century Judaism
 
Deportation